Connor Joseph Taylor (born 5 September 1992) is an English footballer who plays for Leamington, where he plays as a forward.

Playing career

Aston Villa
Taylor began his professional career with Premier League side Aston Villa. However, his time at the club was unsuccessful, and he was released on 23 May 2012 without having made an appearance.

Tamworth (loan)
On 2 March 2012, Taylor agreed to join Conference National side Tamworth on a month-long loan deal. In total, he made eight appearances for the club and scored his one and only goal for The Lambs in a 1–1 draw with Grimsby Town.

Walsall
Following his release by Aston Villa, Taylor signed a one-year contract with League One side Walsall on 1 August 2012, arriving at the Banks's Stadium on the same day as former West Bromwich Albion player Paul Downing. He only made one appearance for the club, playing the entirety of a 3–0 defeat in the League Cup away to Queens Park Rangers on 28 August 2012. Taylor was released by Walsall on 9 May 2013, along with Richard Taundry, George Bowerman, Aaron Williams and Jake Jones.

Nuneaton Town (loan)
In October 2012, whilst still at Walsall, he joined Football Conference side Nuneaton Town on a one-month loan, which was later extended. He made 18 appearances with the club and scored one goal in a 1–1 home draw with Mansfield Town on 6 November 2012.

Nuneaton Town
Following been released by Walsall, Taylor signed a permanent deal with Nuneaton Town on 9 July 2013, joining the club on the same day as on-loan Birmingham City defender Amari'i Bell In total, he made 22 appearances with the club during the 2013–14 season. He was invited back to training for on 1 May 2014 for the subsequent 2014–15 season by manager Brian Reid, despite being out of contract with the club.

Tamworth
On 3 June 2014, Taylor re-joined newly relegated Conference North side Tamworth, where he signed a one-year deal, and was joined by former Nuneaton Town colleagues James Belshaw and Jon Adams.

Leamington
Despite the offer of a new contract from Tamworth, Connor joined Leamington on 21 May 2018, securing an immediate return to the National League North.

Bromsgrove Sporting
Following a three year spell with Leamington, Taylor opted to sign for Southern League Premier Division Central side Bromsgrove Sporting on 16 July 2021.

Return to Leamington
On 23 March 2022, Taylor returned to former club Leamington.

Career statistics

References

External links

1992 births
Living people
English footballers
Association football forwards
Coventry Sphinx F.C. players
Aston Villa F.C. players
Tamworth F.C. players
Walsall F.C. players
Nuneaton Borough F.C. players
Leamington F.C. players
Bromsgrove Sporting F.C. players
National League (English football) players
Southern Football League players